The following is a list of characters for Bandai's arcade game and anime franchise, Aikatsu Stars!.

Playable characters

Four Star Academy

 (speaking voice), Sena from AIKATSU☆STARS! (singing voice)
The main protagonist, Yume is a first year middle school student who has recently entered Four Star Academy with her best friend Koharu Nanakura with the goal of becoming part of the top idol unit, S4, a goal which came to fruition after attending the concert of S4's Hime Shiratori, of whom Yume is a big fan. While Yume's singing and dancing are still lacking, her energy and hard-work more than makes up for it. Yume also owns a hidden power that on special occasions allows her to perform above her limit, which has garnered her interest from the academy's headmaster. In Episode 3, it is revealed that before transferring to Four Star, she was a member of the volleyball club, and in Episode 12, that her parents own a confectionery shop. Yume has a complicated relationship with the leader of M4, Subaru Yuuki. While Yume initially disliked him for teasing her, such as calling her "boiled octopus" due to her red face, she quickly befriended him. A Cute type idol, her theme color is pink.
After becoming part of the 26th generation S4 in Episode 50, she created her own dress brand "Berry Parfait". She's part of the Song Class. In Episode 73, she and Koharu created a new dress brand, "Rainbow Berry Parfait", which is the evolution of her previous brand. She is the seventh idol to gain star wings. Her wings of the planet is earth. She then get the 2nd in the Aikatsu Ranking. After that she got her Sun Dress in episode 96 and then become the World Champion after winning in the Final Tournament.

 (speaking voice), Rie from AIKATSU☆STARS! (singing voice)
Rola is Yume's classmate, as well as her rival and first friend at Four Stars outside of Koharu. Rola comes from a long line of musicians, with her father being a violinist and her mother being a pianist. With her family's pride on the line, Rola is determined to become the top Flower Song student and earning herself a spot in S4. She is caring and has a strong sense of justice, but hates losing and can sometimes act before thinking. A Cool type idol, her theme color is blue, and she is a Flower Song Class student.
In Season 2, Rola is chosen by Yume to be a Flower Song Class admin. She also becomes the student council vice-president. She's became the muse of "Spice Chord" after Tsubasa decided to leave for Hollywood- proving to be a well-earned honor after passing a test in Episode 62. She is the fifth idol to gain her wings. Her wings of the planet are Mars.
 She is mostly known for being the Campaign Girl of a Taiyaki shop, wearing a giant Taiyaki costume.

 (speaking voice), Nanase from AIKATSU☆STARS! (singing voice)
Yume's childhood friend and roommate. She is quiet, gentle, and demure, but is always willing to lend a hand to those in need. Koharu is a big fan of Yozora Kasumi, which developed after Yozora helped her with her glasses and complimented Koharu's skin, not unlike Yume's adoration for Hime. She also holds a love for candy, carrying large amounts of candy with her at all times and offering them to others. A Sexy type idol, her theme color is purple, and she was a Moon Beauty Class student in Four Star Academy until her departure to Italy in Episode 30 (due to her father's work).
In Episode 51, she was shown to attend Venus Ark. She is respected by Elza because of her extraordinary skill in design, a passion she's had for a very long time. She would then return to Four Star Academy in Episode 71. She co-founded the "Rainbow Berry Parfait" brand with Yume, which debuted in Episode 73.

 (speaking voice), Miki from AIKATSU☆STARS! (singing voice)
Debuts in episode 6 of the anime. Ako is a student from the Bird Drama Class. She is highly and rightfully confident in her abilities as an actress and at first sight seems to be calm and collected, but is actually easily flustered, temperamental, and has a tendency to act like a cat and attack people when angry. She appears to have a rather obsessive crush on Subaru Yuki, a member of the top male idol unit M4, and becomes jealous towards other girls who interact with him (namely, Yume). A Pop type idol, her theme color is lime green, and she is a Bird Theatre Class student.
Ako becomes one of the 26th generation S4 in Episode 50.
Her preferred brand in Season 1 was Shiny Smile, but in Episode 51 it is revealed that she applied to become the muse of FuwaFuwa Dream, only to lose with Venus Ark's Kirara Hanazono. In Episode 74 Kirara proposes to Ako the idea of becoming the brand's "double muses", which she accepts. Later the girls create a unit (in Aikatsu Friends! named FuwaFuwa Dreamer).

 (speaking voice), Ruka from AIKATSU☆STARS! (singing voice)
One of the 25th S4 member in Season 1. She is two years above Yume, and Yume's favorite idol. Kind and elegant, Hime has been in the entertainment industry since she was young, earning herself experience in various fields such as modeling, dancing, and acting, but her true talent lies in singing, in which she is described as having an angelic voice. It is revealed in Episode 11 that she is sensitive to the low pressure when it is raining, causing her to become extremely lethargic. She is aware of Yume's special ability, which often leads her into confrontations with the headmaster out of concern. A Cute type idol, her theme color is pastel blue, and she is a Flower Song Class student.
She is the founder of her own dress brand "My Little Heart".

 (speaking voice), Nanase from AIKATSU☆STARS! (singing voice)
One of the 25th S4 member in Season 1, and the student council president. She has a cool personality, but is compassionate and reliable, thus making her popular among underclassmen. In Episode 3, she reveals that she originally auditioned to be a Flower Song student but switched to the Bird Theatre Class after meeting Hime. She initially believes that idols shouldn't need to depend on others, and befriended a wild owl in order to cope with her loneliness before the school forbid her from seeing it, but soon comes to learn the importance of friendship after discovering that the owl now has a family. A Cool type idol, her theme color is red, and she is a Bird Theatre Class student.
She was the representative muse of her own dress brand "Spice Chord" until she left for Hollywood in Episode 62. She chooses Rola to be the new muse, after the latter passed a test.

 (speaking voice), Kana from AIKATSU☆STARS! (singing voice)
One of the 25th S4 member in Season 1, but a year younger than Hime, Tsubasa, and Yozora. She is unpredictable and free-spirited and described as a dancing genius. A Pop type idol, her theme color is yellow-orange, her preferred brand is Shiny Smile, and she is a Wind Dance Class student. She's typically very active and gets bored easily, and runs away so much that her admins have to find a means to catch her and bring her back in time for a live. In Episode 98 she creates a unit with Lily, named "Yuzu'n'Lily"
She is the representative muse of her own dress brand "Shiny Smile". Yuzu was also the only 25th generation S4 to remain as part of the 26th generation, becoming the new leader of the group. She is the sixth idol to gain her wings. Her wings of the planet are Saturn.

 (speaking voice), Miho from AIKATSU☆STARS! (singing voice)
One of the 25th S4 member in Season 1. A top model, Yozora is a charismatic, big sister-type person who actively cares for her juniors. A Sexy type idol, her theme color is violet, her preferred brand is Romance Kiss, and she is a Moon Beauty Class student.
She is the representative muse of her own dress brand "Romance Kiss", but she leaves the role to her sister after she decided to leave Four Star Academy and study aboard in Episode 50.

 (speaking voice), Kana from AIKATSU☆STARS! (singing voice)
Debuts in the DCD game's 2016 series part 2 and episode 8 in the anime. Mahiru is Yozora's younger sister, and has a similar aptitude for modeling. She has a mature aura that makes her difficult to approach, but is shown to quickly befriend Koharu after she gives Mahiru cough drops to help with her cough. Her goal is to surpass her sister, with whom she initially held a strong animosity towards. A Sexy type idol, her theme color is rose pink, and she is a Moon Beauty Class student.
After becoming part of the 26th generation S4 in Episode 50, she inherits the role of brand muse of "Romance Kiss" from her sister. She is the fourth idol to gain her wings. Her wings of the planet are Neptune.

 (speaking voice), Nanase from AIKATSU☆STARS! (singing voice)
Debuts in the DCD game's 2016 Series Part 3 and episode 23 in the anime. A senior admin of the Song Class, Lily is a strong, self-composed girl who isn't easily influenced by others. She is a childhood friend of Yuzu's, who is the only person who is allowed to call her . A Cool type idol, her theme color is viridian, and is a Flower Song Class student and admin. In Episode 98 she creates a unit with Yuzu, named "Yuzu'n'Lily"
She creates her own dress brand "Gothic Victoria" in Episode 39. She is the second idol to gain her wings. Her wings of the planet are Pluto.

Venus Ark

 (speaking voice), Risa Aizawa (singing voice)
Debuts in the DCD game's 2017 Series Part 1 and episode 51 in the anime. The founder of Venus Ark and an heir to a faraway country. She has been a perfectionist since she was a child, but seems distant from other idols. A Sexy type idol, her theme color is gold and she is the founder of her own brand, "Perfect Queen". The founding of Venus Ark and Perfect Queen shares the same purpose: to become the top and the best in the world among all brands, all schools, and all idols. For the sake of gathering all idols and brands of excellence, Elza has a vast knowledge on the topic.
Elza aims to get Hime to join Venus Ark, and targets Yume as a lure in order to do so. Elza is also the first idol to be recognized by the Aikatsu system and gain her Wings of Stars- her own wings representing the planet Venus. She has plundered many idols from around the world just for her to get a sun dress.

 (speaking voice), Miho from AIKATSU☆STARS! (singing voice)
Debuts in the DCD game's 2017 Series Part 1 and appeared as a cameo in episode 51 in the anime. Kirara is a student of Venus Ark who was born in New Zealand. Kirara has a fluffy character and lives freely without restrictions. She tends to surprise those around her with her unexpected behavior. Although Kirara is often lonely and pampered, she developed great color and design sense from her mother, who is a painter. Kirara is also known as an idol born into the skin of a prodigy. A Pop type idol, her theme color is pastel purple and her preferred brand is "FuwaFuwa Dream", sharing brand muse position with Ako. 
She is the third idol to gain her wings after Elza and Lily. Her wings of the planet are Mercury.

 (speaking voice), Rie from AIKATSU☆STARS! (singing voice)
Debuts in the DCD game's 2017 Series Part 1 and episode 51 in the anime. Hailing from the US, she is the secretary of Elza and co-runs Venus Ark with her. Her support for Elza stemmed from the inspiration she received from knowing upon Elza's dream. Rei is known to have a calm disposition at all times and has a perfect behavior like that of a butler. She also likes to collect cute things. She is speculated to have once been a famous idol, Shooting Star. She is a Cool type idol, her theme color is silver and her brand is Royal Sword. She is the ninth idol to gain her star wings . Her wings of stars is Uranus.

 (speaking voice), Ruka from AIKATSU☆STARS! (singing voice)
Debuts in the DCD game's 2017 Series Part 4 and episode 72 in the anime. A student of Venus Ark, she is known to be a prodigy and is considered by Hime as an "Aikatsu-heaven sent child". After bringing a lot of attention overseas, she was invited by Hime to come to Japan. She would become the muse of Hime's brand, "My Little Heart". She is a Cute type idol and her theme color is light pink. She is the eighth idol to gain her star wings. Her wings of the planet is Jupiter.

Supporting & Recurring characters

M4

A student at Four Star Academy's male vision and a member of the top male idol unit, M4. He often meets up with Yume incidentally, and makes it a habit of teasing her, but is shown to give her solid advice. He likes to annoy Yume by calling her "Tomato" or "Boiled Octopus". He is speculated to have a sort of interest in Yume.

A member of M4 and Moon Beauty Class. He is aware that Subaru is in love with Yume, going as far as to inquire if Subaru was jealous of him and Yume. Nozomu becomes reassured when he denies this, as he would hate having to go up against "a rival as strong as Subaru".

A member of M4 and the Bird Theatre Class. He is Yozora and Mahiru's brother, he has a bubbly and playful personality. He is speculated to have a sort of interest in Koharu.

A member of M4 and the Wind Dance Class. He has interests in Ako and often teases her after knowing that she has a crush on Subaru.

Four Star Academy Students

Yume's upperclassman who's in charge of the Dress Make Room, where idols can customize and create their own coords. She is a Cool type idol and she is a senior manager of the Flower Song Class along with Lily Shirogane.

An excitable girl who is the top student of the Wind Dance Class first years. She goes to Hollywood after Yuzu wins a dance competition.

Four Star Academy staff

The mysterious headmaster of Four Star Academy. He has a subtly merciless and manipulative personality, frequently setting up trials to test Yume's ability and stating that if Yume does perform up to par, he will expel her from the school, and that her life as an idol will come to an end if she does not learn to control her power. It is revealed that he acts that way because he doesn't want his students to end up like his sister, Hotaru, who lost her ability to sing due to relying too much on a mysterious power, similar to what Hime and Yume has.

The homeroom teacher of the Flower Song class. Her personality, mannerisms, and appearance are that of an archetypical rock star. It's revealed in Episode 27, that Anna was Four Star Academy student and S4 member.

The instructor of the Bird Theatre class. It's revealed in Episode 27, that Momoko was Four Star Academy student and S4 member.

The instructor of the Wind Dance class.

The instructor of the Moon Beauty class. It's revealed in Episode 27, that Tamagoro have a sister named Tamae who is a Four Star Academy student and S4 member

Entertainment Officials

The director of S4's special programs. He later attends Yume's first solo concert.

The director of Aikatsu! TV dramas. He later attends Yume's first solo concert.

The president of a sweets shop known as Saiwai Hanando and an old friend of Headmaster Morohoshi's. She later attends Yume's first solo concert.

Family Members
 and 
 (Masaru) and Aya Hisakawa (Kyoko)
Yume's parents.
 / 

Hikaru's older sister. A former Four Star Academy student and former S4's representative of Flower Song Class during her time. Hotaru was the first person to have experienced a mysterious power, before Hime and Yume. But due to relying on that power too much, she lost her ability to sing. Her voice was known as "The Fleeting Shooting Star". Now, Hotaru is a gardener.

Miscellaneous
 and 
 (Ayumi) Yūki Kuwahara (Naho)
Two girls from Shiny Academy who auditioned to become Saiwai Hanando's campaign girl. They initially belittle Yume, saying she's unfit for Four Star Academy, but are later helped by Yume across a tight rope bridge. They are later seen watching Four Star Academy's Summer Festival. They reappear in the next campaign girl auditions, but lose again.

 and 
 (Nico) and Yūki Kuwahara (Coco)
Two elementary school sisters who are big fans of Yume and later attend Yume's first solo concert.

References

Aikatsu Stars